German-Albanian rapper Azet has released two studio album, one collaborative album, two extended plays and forty-two singles including seven singles as a featured artist. 

Azet premiered his first studio album Fast Life in 2018 and debuted the charts at number one in Germany, Austria and Switzerland which also spawned five singles such as "Gjynah", "9 Milly", "Ketten Cartier", "Kriminell" and notably "Qa Bone" which was certified gold in the German-speaking Europe. 

He achieved similar success in 2019 with the subsequent collaborative album Super Plus with Zuna which topped the charts at number one in Germany, Austria and number two in Switzerland. The album spawned four singles such as "Skam koh", "Lelele", "Wenn die Sonne untergeht", "Hallo Hallo" and "Fragen" all of them entering the charts in all three countries.

Albums

Studio albums

Collaborative albums

Extended plays

Singles

As lead artist

As featured artist

Other charted songs

See also 
 List of number-one hits of 2018 (Germany)
 List of number-one hits of 2019 (Germany)

References 

 

Discographies of Albanian artists
Discographies of German artists 
Hip hop discographies